Sher Khan is 1981 Pakistani action and musical film directed by Younis Malik and produced by Anwar Kamal Pasha. Film starring actor Sultan Rahi, Anjuman, Iqbal Hassan, and Mustafa Qureshi.

Cast

 Sultan Rahi
 Anjuman as Tange wali
 Nazli as Bano
 Iqbal Hassan as Sher Khan
 Nannha as Gamoo
 Mustafa Qureshi as Haibat Khan
 Seema as Mother of Haibat khan
 Bahar Begum as Sabira
 Aliya Begum
 Habib as Jailer
 Adeeb as friend of Sher Khan
 Ilyas Kashmiri as Hashim Khan
 Altaf Khan
 Iqbal Durrani
 Haider Abbas
 Huma Dar
 Badaal
 Maqbool Butt

Guests 
 Talish
 Rehan
 Aliya
 Changezi
 Ladla

Reception
This film became a runaway success and became a diamond jubilee film. When released, it was one of the highest-grossing film in the history of Pakistan. It ran for 5 years in various cinemas. Anjuman became an overnight star through this film. This movie started the Anjuman-Sultan Rahi era in the Pakistani Punjabi film industry. They appeared in a record number of 117 films together.

Awards
Won 5 Nigar Awards in 1981 for Best Film, Best Director, Best Actor, Best Actress and Best Music in the Pakistani films (Punjabi language) category.

Film soundtrack
The music of the film is by musician Wajahat Attre. 
 The lyrics were penned by Waris Ludhianavi and Khawaja Pervez. This was one of Wajahat Attre's three hit scores from the year 1981, the others being Chan Varyam  (1981) and Sala Sahib (1981).

Track listing

References

External links 
 

Pakistani crime action films
Fantasy action films
Punjabi-language Pakistani films
1981 films
Nigar Award winners
1980s Punjabi-language films